This is a list of the administrators and governors of Abia State, Nigeria, which was created on 1991-08-27, when it was split from Imo State.

* Military administrators appointed by the ruling dictators of their respective times.

See also
Governor of Abia State
List of state governors of Nigeria

References

Abia
Governors